The 2018 BWF World Tour Finals (officially known as the HSBC BWF World Tour Finals 2018 for sponsorship reasons) was the final tournament of the 2018 BWF World Tour. It was held from 12 to 16 December 2018 in Guangzhou, China and had a total prize of $1,500,000.

Tournament
The 2018 BWF World Tour was the first edition of the BWF World Tour Finals and was organized by the Guangzhou Sports Bureau, Guangzhou Sports Competitions Centre, Guangzhou Badminton Administrative Centre, and Guangzhou Badminton Association. It was hosted by the Chinese Badminton Association and Guangzhou Municipal Government with sanction from the BWF.

Venue
This international tournament was held at the Tianhe Gymnasium in Tianhe, Guangzhou, China.

Point distribution
Below is the point distribution table for each phase of the tournament based on the BWF points system for the BWF World Tour Finals event.

Prize money
The total prize money for this year's tournament was US$1,500,000. Distribution of prize money was in accordance with BWF regulations.

Representatives

Eligible players 
Below are the eligible players for World Tour Finals. Rankings used are accurate as of 29 November 2018.

Men's singles

Women's singles

Men's doubles

Women's doubles

Mixed doubles 

 Notes: In the women's singles, the 7th-ranked Carolina Marín, who received the wild cards as the women's singles world champion, withdrew from the competition due to injury. The player next in line, He Bingjiao could not fulfill the invitation due to injury as well.

Representatives by nation 

§: Yuta Watanabe from Japan was the only player who played in two categories (men's doubles and mixed doubles).

Performances by nation

Men's singles

Group A

Group B

Finals

Women's singles

Group A

Group B

Finals

Men's doubles

Group A

Group B

Finals

Women's doubles

Group A

Group B

Finals

Mixed doubles

Group A

Group B

Finals

References

External links
 HSBC BWF World Tour Finals website
 Tournament Link
 HSBC BWF World Tour website

BWF World Tour Finals
International sports competitions hosted by China
2018 in Chinese sport
Sports competitions in Guangzhou
BWF World Tour Finals
Badminton tournaments in China